This is a list of convicted war criminals found guilty of war crimes under the rules of warfare as defined by the World War II Nuremberg Trials (as well as by earlier agreements established by the Hague Conferences of 1899 and 1907, the Kellogg-Briand Pact of 1928, and the Geneva Conventions of 1929 and 1949).

American Civil War
Champ Ferguson (1821-1865), Confederate guerrilla leader sentenced to death for the murders of civilians, prisoners and wounded soldiers during the American Civil War.
Henry Wirz (1822–1865), Confederate administrator of the Andersonville Prison

Liberian Civil War 
Charles McArthur Emmanuel (born 1978), Anti-Terrorist Unit member convicted of torture and gang activity. 
Charles Taylor (born 1948), 22nd President of Liberia, guilty on 11 counts of war crimes and crimes against humanity during both the Sierra Leone Civil War and the Second Liberian Civil War.

Guatemalan Civil War 
Felipe Cusanero, military officer convicted of war crimes, torture, and forced disappearances.
Candido Noriega, farmer with far-right paramilitary connections who aided in the capture and murder of left-wing civilians.
Otto Pérez Molina (born 1950), Director of Military Intelligence who was involved in scorched earth campaigns, torture, and the murder of POWs and civilians. 
Efraín Ríos Montt (1926–2018), President of Guatemala from 1982 to 1983, sentenced to 80 years in prison for war crimes and acts of genocide perpetrated during the Guatemala Civil War.

World War I 
Edith Cavell (1865-1915), abused the protection arising from medical status by helping PoWs escape, sentenced to death
Ahmed Djemal (1872-1922), Minister of the Navy of the Ottoman Empire, sentenced to death in absentia for his role in the Armenian genocide 
Enver Pasha (1881–1922), Triumvir of the Ottoman Empire, sentenced to death in absentia for his role in the Armenian genocide 
Mehmed Talat (1874-1921), Grand Vizier of the Ottoman Empire, sentenced to death in absentia for his role in the Armenian genocide

World War II

European theatre

Austria
Rudolf Creutz (1896-1980), Austrian member of the Nazi SS, ordered mass deportation, sentenced to 15 years in prison at the Nuremberg RuSHA trial, released in 1951.
Alexander Löhr (1885–1947), Austrian and German Air Force (Luftwaffe) commander
Franz Murer (1912–1994), Austrian Nazi SS officer, sentenced to 25 years in prison for multiple extrajudicial killings in Vilnius
Artur Seyss-Inquart (1892–1946), Austrian government official, collaborator and High Commissioner of the Netherlands

Croatia
Andrija Artuković (1899–1988), Croatian minister of Justice and Internal Affairs, Ustaše, sentenced to death, but died before execution
Miroslav Filipović (1915–1946), Croatian Ustashi and administrator of the Jasenovac concentration camp
Slavko Kvaternik (1878–1947), Croatian military commander and Minister of Domobranstvo (Armed Forces)
Ljubo Miloš (1919–1948), Ustaše official in the Independent State of Croatia (NDH) during World War II
Antun Najzer, Croatian physician and member of the Fascist Ustaše movement. He was sentenced to execution by a firing squad.
Ante Pavelić (1889–1959), Croatian leader of the Ustaše, sentenced to death in absentia for multiple war crimes perpetrated during World War II.
Dinko Šakić (1921–2008), a convicted Croatian war criminal and commander of the Jasenovac concentration camp during World War II.
Tomislav Sertić (1902–1945), member of the Croatian World War II Ustaše regime
Vjekoslav Servatzy Croatian Ustaše military officer
Slavko Štancer (1872–1945), commander-in-chief and inspector-general of "Domobranstvo", the regular army of the Independent State of Croatia during the Second World War

France
Fernand de Brinon (1885–1947), French collaborator and member of the Vichy government
Joseph Darnand (1897–1945), Vichy French chief of police.
Philippe Pétain (1856–1951), Marshal of France and head of the collaborative Vichy France, sentenced to death first, then life imprisonment

Hungary
László Baky (1898–1946), Hungarian Interior Ministry official
Laszlo Bardossy (1890–1946), Hungarian Prime Minister
Franz Anton Basch (1901–1946), German Nazi leader in Hungary
László Endre (1895–1946), Hungarian Minister of the Interior
Béla Imrédy (1891–1946), Hungarian Prime Minister
Andor Jaross (1896–1946), Hungarian Nazi collaborator, executed by firing squad
Ferenc Szálasi (1897–1946), Hungarian head of state
Dome Sztojay (died 1946), Hungarian prime minister

Italy
Nicola Bellomo (1881–1945), Italian Army general, executed by firing squad
Pietro Caruso (1899-1944), Italian police chief of Rome
Guido Buffarini Guidi (1895–1945), Minister of the Interior for the Italian Social Republic, found guilty of committing ethnic cleansing during World War II and executed by firing squad in 1945
Giovanni Ravalli (1910–1998), soldier in the Royal Italian Army during World War II, initially received a life sentence but was pardoned after serving 13 years.
Vincenzo Serrentino (1897–1947), Italian judge of the Italian Extraordinary Court for Dalmatia

Nazi Germany
Otto Abetz (1903–1958), German ambassador to France, sentenced to 20 years
Josef Altstötter (1892–1979), German Ministry of Justice official, sentenced to five years in prison but was released on parole after only two-and-a-half years
Otto Ambros (1901–1990), chemist in Nazi Germany, created unethical weapons used at concentration camps, sentenced to 8 years in prison at the Nuremberg IG Farben trial, released in 1951.
Wilhelm von Ammon (1903–1992), administrator in the ministry of Justice in Nazi Germany, sentenced to 10 years in prison at the Nuremberg judges' trial, released in 1951.
Erich von dem Bach-Zelewski (1899–1972), German official and SS officer
Hans Baier (1893–1969), economic administration for the SS in Nazi Germany, sentenced to 10 years in prison at the Nuremberg Pohl trial, released in 1951.
Klaus Barbie (1913–1991), German Gestapo officer
Hermann Becker-Freyseng (1910–1961), consultant for aviation medicine in Nazi Germany, sentenced to 20 years in prison, taken into American custody until his death.
Wilhelm Beiglböck (1905–1963), medical internist in Nazi Germany, sentenced to 15 years in prison in the Nuremberg doctors' trial.
Gottlob Berger (1897–1975), German SS official
Werner Best (1903–1989), German Plenipotentiary of Denmark
Hans Biebow (1902–1947), chief of German Administration of the Łódź Ghetto
Paul Blobel (1894–1951), German Einsatzgruppe C official
Kurt Blome (1894–1969), high ranking scientist in Nazi Germany, charged in the Nuremberg doctor's trial, avoided sentencing by taking a job in the United States.
Hanns Bobermin (1903–1960), economic administrator for the SS in Nazi Germany, sentenced to 20 years in prison at the Nuremberg Pohl trial, released in 1951.
Franz Böhme (1885–1947), Nazi general in Nazi-occupied Yugoslavia, indicted for war crimes at the Nuremberg Hostages Trial, committed suicide in prison.
Martin Ludwig Bormann (1900–c. 1945), German Party Chancellor, Tried at Nuremberg in absentia
Philipp Bouhler (1899–1945), German Führer Chancellory official
Viktor Brack (1904 –1948), German Führer Chancellory official
Otto Bradfisch (1903–1994), member of the German SS Obersturmbannführer, Leader of Einsatzkommando 8 of Einsatzgruppe B of the Security Police (Sicherheitspolizei) and the SD, and Commander of the Security Police in Litzmannstadt (Łódź) and Potsdam
Karl Brandt (1904–1948), German Plenipotentiary for Health official
Rudolf Brandt (1909–1948), secretary of Heinrich Himmler
Walther von Brauchitsch (1881–1948), German Commander-in-Chief of the Army
Werner Braune (1909–1951), German Einsatzgruppe D official
Heinz Brückner (born 1913-† unknown), German official on illegal extradition, sentenced to 15 years in prison at the Nuremberg RuSHA trial, released in 1951.
Josef Bühler (1904–1948), German Generalgouvernement official
 (1885–1966), German industrialist, created unethical weapons in Nazi-occupied Norway, sentenced to 2 years in prison at the Nuremberg IG Farben trial.
Odilo Burkart (1899–1979), Nazi industrialist, charged and indicted with using slave labor at the Nuremberg Flick trial, released in 1947.
Heinrich Bütefisch (1894–1969), Chemist in Nazi Germany, member of the SS, sentenced to 6 years in prison at the Nuremberg IG Farben trial, released in 1951.
Carl Clauberg (1898-1957), Nazi doctor (gynecologist) who conducted human experiments at the Auschwitz concentration camp
Kurt Daluege (1897–1946), German ORPO and Protektorat official
Theodor Dannecker (1913–1945), German SS deportation expert in France and Bulgaria
Ernst Dehner (1889–1970), Nazi general, sentenced to 7 years in prison at the Nuremberg Hostages trial, released in 1951.
Dominyk Delta (1892–1966), personal bodyguard to Adolf Hitler and commander of Nazi security
John Demjanjuk (1920-2012), Nazi camp guard at Sobibor extermination camp
Otto Dietrich (1898–1957), personal Press Secretary to Adolf Hitler
Oskar Dirlewanger (1895-1945), German Oberführer who committed one of the most notorious war crimes in WWII
Karl Dönitz (1891–1980), German naval commander and Hitler's appointed successor
Anton Dostler (1891–1945), German General
  (1899–1967), industrialist at Monowitz concentration camp, sentenced to 8 years in prison at the Nuremberg IG Farben trial.
Adolf Eichmann (1906–1962), German SS official
August Eigruber (1907–1947), German Gauleiter of Oberdonau (Upper Danube) and Landeshauptmann of Upper Austria
Franz Eirenschmalz (born in 1901), economic administrator for the SS in Nazi Germany, sentenced to death at the Nuremberg Pohl trial, commuted and released in 1951.
Franz von Epp (1882–1946), Bavarian politician
Gottfried von Erdmannsdorff (1893–1946), German general
Heinz Fanslau (1909–1987), general of the SS in Nazi Germany, sentenced to 20 years in prison at the Nuremberg Pohl trial, released in 1954.
Hellmuth Felmy (1885–1965), Nazi commander in Southern Greece, sentenced to 15 years in prison at the Nuremberg Hostages Trial, released in 1951.
Fritz Fischer (1912–2003), doctor who committed experiments at Ravensbrück concentration camp, sentenced to life in prison at the Nuremberg doctor's trial, released in 1954.
Friedrich Flick (1883–1972), Nazi industrialist, sentenced to 7 years in prison at the Nuremberg Flick trial.
Albert Forster (1902–1952), Nazi German politician who served as Gauleiter of the Free City of Danzig, sentenced to death and hanged.
August Frank (1898–1984), SS administrator and economist, sentenced to life in prison at the Nuremberg Pohl trial, commuted to 15 years.
Hans Frank (1900–1946), governor of Nazi-occupied Poland, sentenced to death and hanged.
Wilhelm Frick (1877–1946), governor of Nazi-occupied Bohemia and Moravia, sentenced to death and hanged.
Walther Funk (1890–1960), minister for economic affairs in Nazi Germany, sentenced to life in prison, released in 1957.
Karl Gebhardt (1897-1948), German SS chief clinician
Karl Genzken (1895–1957), German SS medical officer
Richard Glücks (1889–1945), German WVHA official
Hermann Wilhelm Göring (1893–1946), Commander of the German Luftwaffe
Amon Göth (1908–1946), Commandant at Nazi concentration camp at Płaszów, Poland
Ulrich Greifelt (died 1949), German Main Office official
Arthur Greiser (died 1946), German Gauleiter of Wartheland
Irma Grese (1923–1945), German administrator of the Auschwitz concentration camp
Oskar Gröning, accessory to mass murder (by handling victims' confiscated possessions) in the Auschwitz concentration camp, sentenced to four years' imprisonment
Karl Gropler (1923–2013), SS Unterscharführer, sentenced to life imprisonment for the Sant'Anna di Stazzema massacre
  (1886–1950), committed war crimes on behalf of Germany in Nazi-occupied Norway, sentenced to 2 years in prison at the Nuremberg IG Farben trial.
Siegfried Handloser (1885–1954), Chief of the German Armed Forces Medical Services in Nazi Germany, sentenced to life in prison, released in 1954.
Fritz Hartjenstein (1905–1954), German Auschwitz concentration camp administrator
Karl Haug (died 1947), Gestapo member, hanged
Emil Haussmann (died 1948), German major
August Heissmeyer (1897–1979), German SS officer
Konrad Henlein (1898–1945), German Gauleiter of Sudetenland
Eberhard Herf (1887–1946), German police official who served as the commander of the Order Police units in Minsk, Belarus, executed by hanging.
Rudolf Hess (1894–1987), deputy Führer (leader) of Nazi Germany
Reinhard Tristan Eugen Heydrich (1904–1942), chief of the SD, the Gestapo, the SIPO & the RSHA and Acting Reichprotektor of Bohemia and Moravia until his assassination in June 1942.
Friedrich Hildebrandt (1898–1948), German NSDAP Gauleiter of Gau Mecklenburg and SS-Obergruppenführer
Richard Hildebrandt (1897–1951), German RuSHA chief and Higher SS and Police Leader of Danzig 
Oskar von Hindenburg (1883–1960), German commander of prisoner of war camps in East Prussia
August Hirt (1898–1945), German medical officer who ran the Struthof-Nazweiler laboratory
Franz Hofer (1902–1975), German Gauleiter of the Tyrol and Vorarlberg
Hermann Höfle (1911–1962), German Higher SS and Police Leader in Slovakia
Otto Hofmann (1896–1982), German RuSHA official
Karl Holz (1895–1945), German NSDAP Gauleiter of Franconia and SA Gruppenführer
Rudolf Hoess (1900–1947), German Auschwitz concentration camp commander and deputy inspector of Nazi concentration camps
Hans Hohberg, executive officer of the SS in Nazi Germany, sentenced to 10 years in prison at the Nuremberg Pohl trial, released in 1951.
Franz Hössler (1906–1945), German SS officer who served as a deputy camp commander at both Auschwitz and Bergen-Belsen concentration camps, executed by hanging in 1945.
Hermann Hoth (1885–1971), German commander of Panzer Group 3, Army Group Center, 17th Group Army and Army Group South
Waldemar Hoven (1903–1948), German Buchenwald concentration camp doctor.
Herbert Hübner (1902–1951), German SS leader, deported people from Poland during the Second World War, sentenced to 15 years in prison at the Nuremberg RuSHA trial, released in 1951.
Otto Ilgenfritz, SS-Obersturmführer, sentenced to 15 years for killing a British soldier, released in 1954.
Max Ilgner (1895–1957), German IG Farben official
 (1879–1965), engineer in Nazi Germany, sentenced to 18 months in prison at the Nuremberg IG Farben trial, released in 1948.
Friedrich Jeckeln (died 1946), German SS officer and Police Leader of Ostland
Alfred Jodl (1890–1946), German commander of operations personnel
Günther Joël (1903–1978), prosecutor in Nazi Germany, sentenced to 5 years in prison at the Nuremberg judges' trial, released in 1951.
Heinz Jost (1904–1964), German Einsatzgruppe commander
Hans Jüttner (1894–1965), commander of German SS's Main Leadership Office and Obergruppenführer.
Ernst Kaltenbrunner (1903–1946), Chief of the SD, the SiPo & the RSHA after Reinhard Heydrich's assassination. Highest-ranking Nazi official to stand trial at Nuremberg. Executed by hanging.
Wilhelm Keitel (1882–1946), German Field Marshal. Sentenced to death by hanging at Nuremberg.
Max Kiefer (1889–1974), economic administrator for the SS in Nazi Germany, sentenced to life in prison at the Nuremberg Pohl trial, released in 1951.
Hans Josef Kieffer (1900-1947), Parisian Gestapo officer, convicted of war crimes, hanged.
Dietrich Klagges (1891–1971), German politician and premier (Ministerpräsident) of Braunschweig
Horst Klein (born 1910), economic administrator for the SS in Nazi Germany, charged and indicted in the Nuremberg Pohl trial, released in 1947. 
Herbert Klemm (1903–1961), State Secretary in the Ministry of Justice in Nazi Germany, sentenced to life in prison at the Nuremberg judges' trial, released in 1956.
Fritz Knoechlein (1911–1949), SS Obersturmbannführer, convicted and executed for war crimes (Le Paradis massacre)
Ilse Koch (1906–1967), German female officer at Buchenwald and Sachsenhausen concentration camps
Carl Krauch (1887–1968), Chairman of the Supervisory Board, member of Göring's Office of the Four-Year Plan, sentenced to 6 years in prison at the Nuremberg IG Farben trial, released in 1950
Alfried Krupp (1907–1967) German Steel/Arms maker; involved in slave labour
  (1900–1968), German industrialist, took over French companies in Nazi-occupied France, sentenced to 18 months in prison at the Nuremberg IG Farben trial, released in 1948.
Walter Kuntze (1883–1960), Nazi general who served as the commander of the 12th Army, sentenced to life in prison but ended up being released in 1953.
Franz Kutschera (1904–1944), German SS general and Gauleiter of Carinthia.
Hubert Lanz (1896–1982), Nazi general, sentenced to 12 years in prison at the Nuremberg Hostages Trial, released in 1951.
Ernst Lautz (1887–1979), Chief Public Prosecutor of the People's Court, sentenced to 10 years in prison at the Nuremberg judges' trial, released in 1951.
Robert Ley (1890–1945), head of the labor force in Nazi Germany, indicted at the Nuremberg trials, committed suicide in custody.
Ernst von Leyser (1889–1962), Nazi general, sentenced to 10 years in prison at the Nuremberg Hostages Trial, released in 1951.
Wilhelm List (1880–1971), Nazi German field marshal, sentenced to life in prison at the Nuremberg hostages' trial, released in 1952.
Hinrich Lohse (1896–1964), German politician
Werner Lorenz (1891–1974), German head of Volksdeutsche Mittelstelle (Repatriation Office for Ethnic Germans) and an SS Obergruppenführer.
Georg Lörner (1899–1959), administrator and economist in the SS in Nazi Germany, sentenced to death, commuted and released in 1954.
Hans Lörner (Born 1893), senior leader of the SS in Nazi Germany, sentenced to 10 years in prison at the Nuremberg Pohl trial, released in 1951.
Emil Maurice (1897–1972), member of the SS, sentenced to four years of labor.
Fritz ter Meer (1884–1967), industrialist in Nazi Germany, planned the Monowitz concentration camp, sentenced to 7 years in prison at the Nuremberg IG Farben trial, released in 1951.
Wolfgang Mettgenberg (1882–1950), representative of the ministry of justice in Nazi Germany, sentenced to 10 years in prison at the Nuremberg judges' trial, died in Landsberg Prison.
Konrad Meyer (1901–1973), General in the Nazi SS, created the Generalplan Ost resulting in the deportation of over 30 million Slavic people, sentenced to time served at the Nuremberg RuSHA trial, released in 1948.
August Meyszner (1886–1947), Higher SS and Police Leader in the German-occupied territory of Serbia.
Erhard Milch (1892–1972), World War II German Luftwaffe officer. 
Joachim Mrugowsky (1905–1948), senior hygienist in Nazi Germany, sentenced to death in the Nuremberg doctor's trial, executed in 1948.
Karl Mummenthey (born 1906), economic administrator for the SS in Nazi Germany, sentenced to life in prison, released in 1953.
Erich Naumann (died 1951), German Einsatzgruppe B commander
Günther Nebelung (1896–1970), Chief Justice of the Nazi People's Court, interned by the Allies in 1945, indicted in the Nuremberg judges' trial, released in 1947.
Hermann Neubacher (died 1960), German supported mayor of Vienna and Southeast Economic Plenipotentiary
Konstantin von Neurath (1873–1956), German Foreign Minister and Reichsprotektor
Herta Oberheuser (1911–1978), doctor at the Ravensbrück concentration camp, sentenced to 20 years in prison at the doctors' trial, released in 1952.
Marc Antony Ocasio (died 1951), German Einsatzgruppe D commander
Rudolf Oeschey (1903–1980), Chief judge of the Special Court at Nuremberg in Nazi Germany, sentenced to life in prison at the Nuremberg judges' trial, released in 1956
Heinrich Oster (1878–1954), Nazi industrialist, sentenced to 2 years in prison at the Nuremberg IG Farben trial, released in 1949.
Friedrich Panzinger (1903–1959), German RSHA official
Franz von Papen (1879–1969), German diplomat and deputy chancellor
Joachim Peiper (1915–1976), SS-Standartenführer, 1st SS Panzer Division, Leibstandarte-SS Adolf Hitler, held responsible for the Malmedy massacre during the Malmedy massacre trial
 (1885–1963), Chief Justice of the people's court in Nazi Germany, charged and indicted in the Nuremberg judges' trial, released in 1947.
Paul Pleiger (1899–1985), German state adviser and corporate general director, sentenced to 15 years
Oswald Pohl (died 1951), German WVHA official
Hermann Pook (1901–1983), dentist for the SS in Nazi Germany, sentenced to 10 years in prison at the Nuremberg Pohl trial, released in 1951.
Helmut Poppendick (1902–1994), chief of personal staff in Nazi Germany, sentenced to 10 years in prison at the doctors' trial, released in 1951.
Erich Raeder (1876–1960), German grand admiral, sentenced to life imprisonment, later released
Friedrich Rainer (1903–1947?), German Gauleiter and an Austrian Landeshauptmann of Salzburg and Carinthia, sentenced to death
Hanns Albin Rauter (died 1949), German Higher SS and Police Leader in the Netherlands, sentenced to death
Hermann Reinecke (1888–1973), German OKW official, sentenced to life imprisonment, later released
Lothar Rendulic (1887–1971), German commander of 52nd Infantry Division, sentenced to 20 years (later 10)
Joachim von Ribbentrop (1893–1946), German foreign minister, sentenced to death
Karl von Roques (died 1949), German Rear Area Army Group South commander
Gerhard Rose (1896–1992), expert on tropical disease in Nazi Germany, performed experiments in Dachau and Buchenwald concentration camp, sentenced to life in prison at the doctors' trial, released in 1955.
Alfred Ernst Rosenberg (1893–1946), German east minister, sentenced to death
Oswald Rothaug (1897–1967), Chief Justice of the special court in Nazi Germany, sentenced to Life in prison at the Nuremberg judges' Trial, released in 1956
Curt Rothenberger (1896–1959), State Secretary in the Ministry of Justice in Nazi Germany, sentenced to 7 years in prison at the Nuremberg judges' Trial, released in 1950
Siegfried Ruff (1907–1989), physician who performed experiments at Dachau concentration camp, charged at the Nuremberg doctor's trial, avoided jail due to his work for the United States.
Fritz Sauckel (1894–1946), German Labour Plenipotentiary official
Konrad Schäfer, aviation doctor in Nazi Germany, charged in the Nuremberg Doctors' trial, avoided jail due to his work for the United States.
Gustav Adolf Scheel (1907–1979), German physician and Nazi deportation officer
Rudolf Scheide (born 1908), economic administrator for the SS in Nazi Germany, charged and indicted in the Nuremberg Pohl trial, released in 1947.
Walter Schellenberg (died 1952), German RSHA official
Baldur von Schirach (1907–1974), German Vienna Reichsstatthalter
Franz Schlegelberger (1876–1970), German State Secretary in the Reich Ministry of Justice (RMJ) and later Justice Minister
Hermann Schmitz (1881–1960), sentenced to 4 years in prison at the Nuremberg IG Farben trial, released in 1950.
Georg von Schnitzler (1884–1962), sentenced to 5 years in prison at the Nuremberg IG Farben trial, released in 1949.
Richard Schnur (died 1947), SS-Hauptsturmführer, sentenced to death for a massacre committed during World War II.
Oskar Schröder (died 1958), Chief of Staff of the Inspectorate of the Medical Service in Nazi Germany, sentenced to life in prison at the Nuremberg Doctors' trial, released in 1954.
Josef Schuetz (1921-), German Waffen-SS prison camp guard. Convicted June 2022 as the oldest person tried for war crimes from Nazi Germany.
Erwin Schulz (1900–1981), German Nazi SS general
Heinrich Schwarz (1906–1947), German administrator of the Auschwitz III Monowitz concentration camp.
Otto Schwarzenberger (born in 1900), Chief of war in Nazi Germany, sentenced to time served in the Nuremberg RuSHA trial, released in 1947.
Siegfried Seidl (1911–1947), German administrator of the Theresienstadt concentration camp
Wolfram Sievers (died 1948), German Ahnenerbe official
Karl Sommer (born in 1915), economic administrator for the SS in Nazi Germany, sentenced to death at the Nuremberg Pohl trial, commuted and released in 1953.
Albert Speer (1905–1981), German armament and munitions minister.
Wilhelm Speidel (1895–1970), Nazi general, sentenced to 20 years in prison at the Nuremberg Hostages Trial, released in 1951.
Franz Walter Stahlecker (1900-1942), German Foreign Office official, Commander of Einsatzgruppe A, the most murderous of the four death squads. Fatally wounded in action by Soviet partisans.
Franz Stangl (1908–1971), German SS officer and administrator of the Sobibór and of the Treblinka concentration camps.
Otto Steinbrinck (1888–1949), German industrialist and member of the SS
Julius Streicher (1885–1946), German journalist and editor of the Der StürmerJürgen Stroop (1895-1952), German SS and Police leader in Warsaw, convicted of murdering 9 US POWs. Hanged at Mokotow Prison in 1952.
Wilhelm Stuckart (1902-1953), German Interior Ministry official. Supported forced sterilization. Sentenced to time served. Released April 1949.
Otto von Stulpnagel (1878-1948), German military commander of Nazi-occupied France, charged with war crimes by French authorities. Committed suicide in Cherche-Midi Prison
Simo Stupar, former Serbian policeman who illegally obtained Bosniaks
Josef Terboven (1898–1945), German Nazi commissioner of Norway
Otto Thierack (1889–1946), German justice minister
Fritz Thyssen (1873–1951), German industrialist
Erwin Tschentscher (1903–1972), economic administrator of the SS in Nazi Germany, sentenced to 10 years in prison at the Nuremberg Pohl trial, released in 1951.
Harald Turner (1891–1947), SS commander and Staatsrat (privy councillor) in the German military administration of the Territory of the Military Commander in Serbia
Josef Vogt (1884–1967), SS economic and administrative official, indicted in the Nuremberg Pohl trial, released in 1947.
Leo Volk (1909–1973), head of legal department of the SS in Nazi Germany, sentenced to 10 years in prison at the Nuremberg Pohl trial, released in 1951.
Robert Wagner (1895–1946), German Chief of Civil Administration in Alsace and Reichsstatthalter of Baden
Walter Warlimont (1894–1976), German OKW official
Maximilian von Weichs (1881–1954), German field marshal
Bernhard Weiss (1904-1973), Nazi industrialist, sentenced to 2½ years in prison at the Nuremberg. Served one year. Nephew of Friedrich Flick Flick trial.
Georg August Weltz (1889–1963), radiologist in Nazi Germany, performed experiments at Dachau concentration camp, indicted for crimes against humanity at the Nuremberg doctors' trial, avoided jail due to his work in the medical field in Germany.
Carl Westphal (1902–1946), administrator for the ministry of Justice in Nazi Germany, committed suicide after being charged and indicted in the Nuremberg judges' trial.
Dieter Wisliceny (1911-1948), German SS deportation expert in Greece, Slovakia and Hungary
Karl Wolff (1900–1984), Heinrich Himmler Chief of Staff

Romania
Ion Antonescu (1882–1946), Prime Minister of Romania during World War II, found guilty of multiple war crimes by the Romanian People's Tribunals and executed by firing squad
Mihai Antonescu (1907–1946), Romanian government official; found guilty by the Romanian People's Tribunals; executed
Constantin Petrovicescu (1883–1949), Romanian soldier and member of the Iron Guard, sentenced to life in prison for war crimes committed during World War II.

Slovakia
Jozef Tiso (1887–1947), President of the First Slovak Republic, sentenced to death and hanged for his role in the Holocaust in Slovakia.
Vojtech Tuka (1880–1946), Prime Minister of the First Slovak Republic from 1939 to 1945, found guilty for mass deportation of Slovak Jews and executed by hanging in 1946.

Yugoslavia
Momčilo Đujić (1907–1999), Serbian commander of the Chetniks, sentenced to death in absentia for multiple war crimes committed in Yugoslavia during World War II.
Draža Mihailović (1893–1946), founder of the Chetniks sentenced to death for genocidal actions taken against Jewish, Muslim and Croat civilians.

Other
Ričards Jasevs (1902-1991), Latvian Nazi collaborator
Sekula Drljević (1884–1945), Montenegrin Nazi collaborator
William Joyce (1906–1946), American-born Nazi propagandist, convicted of high treason and executed by hanging.
Carmen Mory, convicted and sentenced to death.
Anthony Sawoniuk (1921–2005), Belarusian collaborator
Cyriel Verschaeve (1874–1949), Flemish priest and Nazi collaborator, sentenced to death in absentia. 
Horace T. West (died 1974), American soldier convicted of premeditated murder committed at Biscari. 

Pacific theatre
Japan
Kōsō Abe (1892-1947), Japanese Admiral convicted and executed for war crimes he committed during the Battle of Kwajalein Atoll 
Kenji Doihara (1883–1948), Japanese general
Kōki Hirota (1878–1948), Japanese premier from 1936 to 1937
Masaharu Homma (1887–1946), Japanese general involved in the Bataan Death March
Seishirō Itagaki (1885–1948), Japanese War Minister
Heitarō Kimura (1888–1948), Japanese General hanged for war crimes
Kuniaki Koiso (1880–1950), Japanese prime minister, sentenced to life imprisonment
Iwane Matsui (1878–1948), general in the Imperial Japanese Army, sentenced to death and hanged for his involvement in the Rape of Nanking.
Akira Mutō (1883–1948), Japanese army commander and member of the General High Staff, sentenced to death
Hiromi Nakayama (died 1946), Imperial Japanese Army soldier hanged for war crimes
Takuma Nishimura (1889–1951), Japanese military officer who was found guilty of perpetrating the Parit Sulong Massacre during World War II, executed by hanging in 1951.
Hiroshi Ōshima (1886–1975), Japanese ambassador to Germany
Shigematsu Sakaibara (1898–1947), admiral in the Imperial Japanese Navy, convicted of killing prisoners of war and executed.
Mamoru Shigemitsu (1887–1957), Japanese foreign minister
Teiichi Suzuki (1888–1989), Lieutenant General who planned Japan’s economy, pardoned in 1958
Yoshio Tachibana (1890-1947), Japanese Lieutenant General convicted for his involvement in  the Chichijima incident, executed by the United states 
Hideki Tōjō (1884–1948), Japanese prime minister and general in the Imperial Japanese Army, sentenced to death and hanged.
Yoshijirō Umezu (1882–1949), successor to Hideki Tojo as Chief of the Imperial Japanese Army General Staff Office, found guilty of waging a war of aggression and sentenced to life in prison in 1948
Tomoyuki Yamashita (1885–1946), Japanese general; his conviction resulted in establishing a new doctrine regarding criminal culpability for the involvement of chain of command in war crimes: Yamashita standard.

Other
Lee Hak-rae, Korean soldier who fought for the Japanese in WWII
Zhang Jinghui (1871–1959), Prime Minister of Manchukuo from 1935 to 1945

Bangladesh Liberation War
Ghulam Azam (1922–2014), former leader of Bangladesh Jamaat-e-Islami sentenced to 90 years' imprisonment for war crimes committed during the Bangladesh Liberation War
Salahuddin Quader Chowdhury (1949-2015), former member of the Parliament of Bangladesh, sentenced to death for multiple war crimes committed during the Bangladesh Liberation War and hanged
Ashrafuz Zaman Khan (born 1948), sentenced to death by hanging for the murder of 18 people described as prominent intellectuals, during the 1971 liberation war of Bangladesh from Pakistan
Abdul Quader Molla (1948–2013), Convicted war criminal from Bangladesh, sentenced to death for mass murder in 1971
Chowdhury Mueen-Uddin (born 1948), sentenced to death by hanging for the murder of 18 people described as prominent intellectuals, during 1971 liberation war of Bangladesh from Pakistan
Motiur Rahman Nizami (1943–2016), leader of Al Badr, sentenced to death and hanged for his role in masterminding the Demra massacre during the Bangladesh Liberation War
Khalilur Rahman, Army General and former Director General of Bangladesh Rifles. He was convicted of killing, torturing, abduction, looting, rape, and arson in 2015 of crimes in 1971. He was sentenced to death and arrested in 2022. He currently sits on death row
Delwar Hossain Sayeedi (born 1940), member of the Parliament of Bangladesh, sentenced to life in prison for war crimes committed during the Bangladesh Liberation War 
Abdus Sobhan (1936–2020), former Bangleshi lawmaker convicted of crimes against humanity in the Bangladesh Liberation War

Dirty War
Adolfo Scilingo (born 1946), Argentine naval officer, sentenced to life in prison for multiple acts of torture and extrajudicial killings during the Dirty War.
Alfredo Astiz (born 1951), Argentine commando convicted of kidnapping and torture. 
Jorge Rafael Videla (1925–2013), President of Argentina from 1976 to 1981, found guilty of multiple war crimes and crimes against humanity during the Dirty War and sentenced to life in prison.

Khmer Rouge regime
Nuon Chea (1926-2019), second-in-command of the Khmer Rouge, sentenced to life in prison for his role in the Cambodian genocide
Kang Kek Iew (1942-2020), Leader of the Khmer Rouge oversaw Tuol Sleng where thousands were murdered and tortured. Sentenced to 30 years' imprisonment and then to life by the Cambodia Tribunal
Khieu Samphan (born 1931), Khmer Rouge official who served as Chairman of the State Presidium of Democratic Kampuchea, sentenced to life in prison for his role in the Cambodian genocide

Rwandan Civil War
Jean-Paul Akayesu (born 1953), Rwandan politician who served as the mayor of the Taba commune, sentenced to life in prison for aiding and abetting in the Rwandan genocide.
Théoneste Bagosora (1941–2021), Rwandan Armed Forces officer sentenced to life in prison for his role in planning and carrying out the Rwandan genocide, later reduced to 35 years on appeal.
Jean-Bosco Barayagwiza (1950–2010), Rwandan war criminal involved in the Hutu Power
Augustin Bizimungu (born 1952), Chief of Staff of the Rwandan Army, sentenced to 30 years in prison for his role in the Rwandan genocide.
Alphonse Higaniro (born 1949), factory owner, sentenced to 20 years.
Jean Kambanda (born 1955), Rwandan politician who served as Prime Minister in the caretaker government of Rwanda during the Rwandan genocide, sentenced to life in prison for his role in planning and carrying out the genocide.
Maria Kisito (born 1964), sentenced to 12 years in prison for supplying gasoline to a militia to burn refugees with.
Gertrude Mukangango, sentenced to 15 years for handing over Tutsi refugees to the militia during the Rwandan genocide.
Désiré Munyaneza (born 1966), Rwandan businessman, sentenced to life in prison for committing multiple acts of war rape during the Rwandan genocide.
Ferdinand Nahimana (born 1950), Rwandan historian who incited the Rwandan genocide
Elie Ndayamabaje, former Mayor of Muganza, Rwanda during the Rwandan Genocide
Hassan Ngeze (born 1957), Rwandan journalist and politician, sentenced to life in prison for his role in the Rwandan genocide, later reduced to 35 years on appeal.
Ildéphonse Nizeyimana (born 1963), Rwandan soldier, who was convicted of having participated in the Rwandan genocide.
Sylvan Nsabimana, Rwandan war criminal charged with crimes against humanity in the Rwandan genocide
Arsène Shalom Ntahobali, Rwandan war criminal charged with crimes against humanity in the Rwandan genocide
Dominique Ntawukulilyayo, sub-prefect of the Gisaraga prefect convicted of genocide during the Rwandan genocide
Vincent Ntezimana, university professor, sentenced to 12 years.
Alphonse Nteziryayo, prefect of Butare during the Rwandan Genocide
Bernard Ntuyahaga (born 1952), Rwandan Army officer, sentenced to 20 years in prison for his role in the murder of ten Belgian United Nations peacekeepers at the beginning of the Rwandan genocide.
Pauline Nyiramasuhuko (born 1946), Rwandan politician. She was indicted on the charges of conspiracy to commit genocide.
Tharcisse Renzaho (born 1944), Rwandan soldier and head of the Civil Defence Committee for Kigali, sentenced to life in prison for his role in the Rwandan genocide.
Georges Rutaganda (1958–2010), commander for the Interahamwe militia, sentenced to life in prison for his role in the Rwandan genocide.
Innocent Sagahutu (born 1962), soldier in the Rwandan Armed Forces who helped carry out the Rwandan genocide, sentenced to 20 years in prison, which would later be reduced to 15 years via appeal.
Athanase Seromba (born 1963), Rwandan Catholic priest, sentenced to life in prison for aiding and abetting in the Rwandan genocide.

Sierra Leone Civil War
Augustine Gbao (born 1948), paramilitary commander for the Revolutionary United Front, sentenced to 25 years in prison for war crimes committed during the Sierra Leone Civil War.
Brima Bazzy Kamara (born 1968), commander in the Armed Forces Revolutionary Council, sentenced to 45 years in prison for multiple war crimes committed during the Sierra Leone Civil War.
Santigie Borbor Kanu (born 1965), senior commander of the Armed Forces Revolutionary Council, sentenced to 51 years in prison for war crimes committed during the Sierra Leone Civil War.
Issa Sesay (born 1970), senior officer of the Revolutionary United Front, sentenced to 52 years in prison for war crimes committed during the Sierra Leone Civil War.
Charles Taylor (born 1948), 22nd President of Liberia, guilty on 11 counts of war crimes and crimes against humanity during both the Sierra Leone Civil War and the Second Liberian Civil War.

Yugoslav Wars
After the Yugoslav Wars, an international Court was formed to try war criminals (ICTY). However, ICTY tried only a selected number of high-ranking people (a total of 161), with local Courts (in Bosnia, Croatia and Serbia) starting trials mostly against individuals or soldiers who carried out orders of those high-ranking officers. Many of those have been convicted.

Croatia raised charges against 3666 people for war crimes, of which 1381 were dropped due to lack of evidence.

Bosnian War
Srecko Acimovic, Former Bosnian Serb Army battalion commander aided genocide against Bosnians
Zlatko Aleksovski (born 1960), Bosnian Croat commander of a prison facility, sentenced to 7 years
Milan Babić (1956–2006), Croatian Serb and prime minister of Republic of Serb Krajina. Sentenced to 13 years following agreement
Zoran Babic, Bosnian Serb policeman who persecuted Bosniaks
Predrag Bastah, Bosnian Serb policeman convicted of killing 37 Bosniak civilians in the Yugoslav Wars
Tihomir Blaškić (born 1960), Bosnian Croat sentenced to 45 years, changed to 9 years following appeal
Boris Bosnjak, Bosnian Serb detention camp guard who mistreated and abused Bosniak and Croat civilian detainees
Miroslav Bralo (born 1967), Bosnian Croat member of the "Jokers" anti-terrorist platoon, sentenced to 20 years
Radoslav Brdjanin (1948–2022), Bosnian Serb sentenced to 32 years (30 following appeal)
Enver Buza, former commander of a Bosnian Army battalion convicted of killing 27 Croat civilians in Uzdol
Ranko Cesic (born 1964), Bosnian Serb sentenced to 18 years for Brcko
Fadil Covic, convicted of illegally detaining Serb and Croat civilians at Silos camp
Halid Covic, convicted of illegally detaining Serb and Croat civilians at Silos camp
Hazim Delić (born 1964), Bosnian Muslim sentenced to 18 years for Čelebići prison camp
Ilija Djajic, Bosnian Serb detention camp guard who mistreated and abused Bosniak and Croat civilian detainees
Mustafa Djelilovic, convicted of illegally detaining Serb and Croat civilians at Silos camp
Damir Došen (born 1967), Bosnian Serb, sentenced to 5 years for Keraterm camp
Senad Dzananovic, Bosnian soldier sentenced to 11 years for crimes against Serbians in Alipašino polje
Dražen Erdemović (born 1972), Bosnian Croat who fought for Serb forces and was sentenced to 5 years for Pileca farm (part of Srebrenica massacre)
Edin Gadzo, Bosnian soldier sentenced to 5 years for crimes against Serbians in Alipašino polje
Stanislav Galić, Bosnian Serb commander in Siege of Sarajevo. Sentenced to 20 years, appealed and had his sentence changed to life imprisonment
Rade Garic, former Bosnian Serb police reservist for inhumane acts
Miodrag Grubacic, Bosnian Serb detention camp guard who mistreated and abused Bosniak and Croat civilian detainees
Becir Hujic, convicted of illegally detaining Serb and Croat civilians at Silos camp
Goran Jelisić (born 1968), Bosnian Serb sentenced to 40 years for murders in Brčko. Personally killed 13 civilians
Mico Jurisic, former Bosnian Serb Policeman who committed crimes against humanity to non-Serb civilians
Nermin Kalember, convicted of illegally detaining Serb and Croat civilians at Silos camp
Radovan Karadžić (born 1945), Bosnian Serb politician who served as President of Republika Srpska during the Bosnian War, sentenced to life in prison for eleven counts of war crimes
Radomir Kezunovic, former Bosnian Serb Army military policeman for killing 28 civilians
Dragan Kolundžija (born 1959), Bosnian Serb, sentenced to 3 years for Keraterm camp
Milojica Kos, Bosnian Serb, sentenced to 6 years for Omarska camp
Radomir Kovač (born 1961), Bosnian Serb sentenced to 20 years
Momčilo Krajišnik, Bosnian Serb politician, sentenced to 27 years
Milorad Krnojelac, Bosnian Serb sentenced to 7½ years for Foča massacres. Following appeal, his sentence was raised to 15 years
Radislav Krstić, Bosnian Serb sentenced to 46 years (35 following appeal) for his part in the Srebrenica massacre, also found guilty of being an accomplice to genocide, first such ruling at ICTY
Dalibor Krstovic, Bosnian Serb Army soldier who raped a POW
Dragoljub Kunarac (born 1960), Bosnian Serb sentenced to 28 years
Miroslav Kvocka, Bosnian Serb, sentenced to 7 years for Omarska camp
Esad Landžo, Bosnian Muslim sentenced to 15 years for Čelebići prison camp
Milan Lukić (born 1967), commander of the White Eagles paramilitary group, sentenced to life in prison for his role in the Višegrad massacres during the Bosnian War.
Sakib Mahmuljin, former Bosnian general convicted of killing Prisoners of War
Dragan Marinkovic, convicted of committing crimes against humanity in Milići, Republika Srpska
Serif Mesanovic, convicted of illegally detaining Serb and Croat civilians at Silos camp
Dragomir Milošević (born 1942), Bosnian Serb soldier in the Army of Republika Srpska, sentenced to 29 years in prison for war crimes committed during the Siege of Sarajevo.
Ratko Mladić (born 1943), officer in the Army of Republika Srpska during the Yugoslav Wars, sentenced to life in prison for roles in the Siege of Sarajevo and Srebrenica massacre
Zdravko Narancic, Bosnian Serb soldier convicted of helping kill 11 POWs
Dragan Nikolić, Bosnian Serb sentenced to 23 years
Slavko Ognjenović, convicted for wartime rape in the Yugoslav war
Radovan Paprica, convicted for wartime rape in the Yugoslav war
Milivoj Petković, Bosnian Croat officer for crimes against humanity and ethnic cleansing
Joja Plavanjac, Bosnian Serb soldier convicted of killing 11 POWs
Biljana Plavšić (born 1930), Bosnian Serb politician and former president of the Republika Srpska. Sentenced to 11 years
Dragoljub Pricac, Bosnian Serb, sentenced to 5 years for Omarska camp
Predrag Prosic, Bosnian Serb soldier convicted of illegally detaining Bosniak civilians

Croatian War of Independence
Branimir Glavaš, former Croatian major general convicted of ethnic cleansing and torturing POWs
Miodrag Jokić (born 1935), commander of the Yugoslav Navy, sentenced to 7 years in prison for war crimes committed during the Siege of Dubrovnik.
Rajko Krickovic, former Croatian soldier convicted of killing a civilian family in the Yugoslav Wars
Milan Martić (born 1954), President and defence minister of Croatian Serbs during Croatian War of Independence, sentenced to 35 years
Boro Milojica, former Bosnian Serb soldier for killing civilians 
Darko Mrdja, Bosnian Serb policeman who persecuted Bosniaks
Mile Mrkšić (1947–2015), Serb General convicted to 20 years for the Vukovar massacre
Zdravko Mucić, Bosnian Croat sentenced to 9 years for Čelebići prison camp
Mirko Norac (born 1967), Croatian Army general sentenced to 12 years in prison for various war crimes committed during the Croatian War of Independence.
Slobodan Praljak (1945–2017), Bosnian Croat general sentenced to 20 years in prison by the ICC for war crimes committed against the Bosniak population. He committed suicide upon hearing of the verdict.
Mlado Radić Bosnian Serb, sentenced to 20 years for Omarska camp
Ivica Rajić (born 1958), Bosnian Croat sentenced to 12 years
Tonco Rajic, former member of the Croatian Defence Forces who mistreated POWs at Dretelj camp
Mirsad Sabic, convicted of illegally detaining Serb and Croat civilians at Silos camp
Duško Sikirica (born 1964), Bosnian Serb, sentenced to 15 years for Keraterm camp
Franko Simatović (born 1950),  convicted for crimes in the Yugoslav Wars
Blagoje Simić (born 1960), Bosnian Serb sentenced to 17 years for Bosanski Šamac
Milan Šimić (born 1960), Bosnian Serb sentenced to 5 years
Veselin Šljivančanin, Serb Colonel convicted to 5 years for the Vukovar massacre
Milomir Stakić (born 1962), Bosnian Serb sentenced to life imprisonment for war crimes in Prijedor and nearby concentration camps
Jovica Stanišić (born 1950), convicted for crimes in the Yugoslav Wars
Pavle Strugar (born 1933), Serb general in the Siege of Dubrovnik. Sentenced to 8 years
Duško Tadić, Bosnian Serb sentenced to 25 years
Miroslav Tadić (born 1937), Bosnian Serb sentenced to 8 years for Bosanski Šamac
Stevan Todorović, Bosnian Serb sentenced to 10 years for Bosanski Šamac
Zdravko Tolimir (1948–2016), Bosnian Serb soldier in the Army of Republika Srpska, sentenced to life in prison for his involvement in the Srebrenica massacre.
Mitar Vasiljević, Bosnian Serb sentenced to 20 years, later lowered to 15 years for war crimes in Višegrad
Goran Viskovic, former member of the Bosnian Serb Army who was convicted of participating in a widespread and systematic attack against the non-Serb population in the Yugoslav Wars
Zoran Vuković (born 1955), Bosnian Serb sentenced to 12 years
Simo Zarić (born 1948), Bosnian Serb sentenced to 6 years for Bosanski Šamac
Zoran Žigić, Bosnian Serb, sentenced to 25 years for Omarska camp

Croat–Bosniak War
Mario Cerkez (born 1959), Bosnian Croat sentenced to 6 years
Edin Dzeko, Bosnian who committed atrocities during the Trusina massacre during the Yugoslav War, extradited and convicted in 2014
Drago Josipović (born 1955), Bosnian Croat sentenced to 15, changed to 12 years following appeal
Dario Kordić (born 1960), Bosnian Croat, sentenced to 25 years
Vinko Martinović (born 1963), Bosnian Croat sentenced to 18 years
Vladimir Šantić (born 1958), Bosnian Croat sentenced to 25 years, changed to 18 following appeal
Mladen Naletilić Tuta (born 1946), Bosnian Croat sentenced to 20 years

Kosovo War
Haradin Bala (1957–2018), Kosovo Albanian soldier, sentenced to 13 years in prison for war crimes committed at Lapušnik prison camp
Vladimir Lazarević, Serbian colonel general, convicted of aiding and abetting crimes against humanity, released in 2015
Sreten Lukić (born 1955), former Chief of the Serbian Police, sentenced to 22 years in prison for war crimes committed during the Kosovo War
Dragoljub Ojdanić (1941–2020), former Chief of the General Staff of the Armed Forces of Yugoslavia, sentenced to 15 years in prison for committing acts of forced displacement during the Kosovo War
Nebojša Pavković (born 1946), Serbian general convicted of crimes against humanity
Nikola Šainović, former Prime Minister of Serbia, convicted of crimes against humanity and released in 2015
Hashim Thaci (born 1968), former President of Kosovo (2016–2020)
Kadri Veseli (born 1967), former Chairman of the Assembly of Kosovo (2014–2019), indicted for crimes against humanity
Salih Mustafa (Born 1972), former KLA commander Indicted for war crimes 
Lahi Brahimaj (Born 1970), Former KLA commander indicted for war crimes, cruel torture

Ituri conflict
Thomas Lubanga Dyilo (born 1960), leader of the Union of Congolese Patriots during the Ituri conflict, sentenced to 14 years in prison for the crime of forcibly conscripting child soldiers.
Germain Katanga (born 1978), former leader of the Patriotic Resistance Front of Ituri, sentenced to 12 years in prison for his role in the Bogoro massacre.

War in Afghanistan
Robert Bales (born 1973), United States Army soldier, sentenced to life in prison without the possibility of parole for perpetrating the Kandahar massacre during the War in Afghanistan
Omar Khadr (born 1986), Canadian convicted for murder and supporting terrorism
Glendale Wells, specialist; he pleaded guilty to being an accessory in the death of the prisoner known as Dilawar

Iraq War
Cardenas J. Alban (born 1975), convicted of killing a civilian child 
Santos Cardona (1974-2009), convicted of torturing detainees at Ab Ghraib prison
Lynndie England (born 1982), member of the United States Army reserve, sentenced to 3 years in prison for her role in the Abu Ghraib scandal, released on parole after serving 2 years
Ivan Frederick (born 1966), convicted of torturing detainees at Abu Ghraib prison
Charles Graner (born 1968), member of the United States Army reserve, sentenced to 10 years in prison for his role in the Abu Ghraib scandal, released on parole after serving 6 years
Steven Dale Green (1985-2014), United States Army soldier, sentenced to life in prison without the possibility of parole for his role in the Mahmudiyah rape and killings during the Iraq War
Donald Payne (born 1970), first member of the British armed forces to be convicted of killing Baha Mousa, jailed for one year and dismissed from the army

Saddam Hussein regime
Ali Daeem Ali (1940–2015), Iraqi Baathist official, sentenced to 15 yearsAli Daeem Ali 
Frans van Anraat (born 1942), Dutch arms dealer who sold raw materials for the production of chemical weapons to Saddam Hussein, sentenced to 15 years in prison
Tariq Aziz (1936–2015), Iraqi foreign minister under Saddam Hussein, death sentence later commuted to life imprisonment where he died in custody
Awad Hamed al-Bandar (1945–2007), Iraqi chief judge, sentenced to death
Saddam Hussein (1937–2006), President of Iraq from 1979 to 2003, executed by hanging for the Dujail Massacre in 2006
Sabawi Ibrahim al-Tikriti (1947–2013), Iraqi Directorate of General Security
Abid Hamid Mahmud (1957–2012), Iraqi military officer
Ali Hassan al-Majid (1941–2010), Iraqi Baathist Defense Minister, executed for war crimes, crimes against humanity, genocide
Aziz Saleh Nuhmah (born 1941), Iraqi governor of Kuwait during occupation
Taha Yassin Ramadan (1938–2007), Iraqi Vice President, 1991–2003, sentenced to life imprisonment, appealed to death
Abdullah Kadhem Ruaid (died 2011), Iraqi Baathist official, sentenced to 15 years
Mizhar Abdullah Ruaid (born 1949), Iraqi Baathist official, sentenced to 15 years
Barzan Ibrahim al-Tikriti (1951–2007), Iraqi head of Mukhabarat, sentenced to death and executed
Watban Ibrahim (1952–2015), former Iraqi interior minister

Syrian Civil war
Mohammad Abdullah, Syrian soldier, convicted of appearing in photos standing over a pile of bodies 
Eyad al-Gharib, Syrian intelligence officer who aided crimes against humanity 
Ahmad al Khedr, convicted for killing a captured Syrian Regime soldier 
Ahmad Al-Y, Syrian man who fought with terrorist organization Ahrar al-Sham 
Anwar Raslan, Syrian military Colonel convicted of crimes committed on behalf of President Bashar al-Assad

 Central African Republic Civil War 
 Yauba Ousman, convicted in 2022 for 2019 Ouham-Pendé killings. 
 Maxime Mokom, member of the Coalition of Patriots for Change. 
 Patrice-Edouard Ngaïssona, leader of Anti-Bakala. 
 Issa Salleh, convicted in 2022 for 2019 Ouham-Pendé killings. 
 Mahamat Tahir, convicted in 2022 for 2019 Ouham-Pendé killings.

Islamic State in Syria and Iraq
Eddie Gallagher, United States navy SEAL who stabbed a injured POW and took photos with the corpse, pardoned in 2019
Clint Lorance, United States First Lieutenant who ordered the shooting of two civilians on a motorcycle, pardoned in 2019
Mathew Golsteyn, United States military officer who murdered a civilian, who he claims was a bombmaker, pardoned in 2019 
Oussama Achraf Akhlafa, Islamic State militant, sentenced to 7½ years in prison
Lina Ishaq, Syrian woman who allowed her pre-teenage son join the Islamic State leading to his death, sentenced to six years at a Swedish tribunal
Nurten J., identity of German woman who travelled to Syria to join ISIS and committed war crimes against property
Russian invasion of Ukraine
Alexander Bobikin, member of an artillery unit, convicted of violating the laws and customs of war
Alexander Ivanov, member of an artillery unit, convicted of violating the laws and customs of war
Vadim Shishimarin, Russian soldier who killed unarmed civilian Oleksandr Shelipov, sentenced to life in prison

Others
Africa
Jean-Pierre Bemba (born 1962), Congolese politician and former rebel leader, sentenced to 18 years in prison for war crimes committed in the Central African Republic, but the conviction was overturned after he served 10 years of his original sentence
Hissène Habré (1942-2021), former President of Chad convicted of rape and ordering the killing and torture of thousands of political opponents
Khalifa Haftar (born 1943), Supreme Commander of the Libyan National Army (2015-present), convicted of extrajudicial killings and torture
Alieu Kosiah (born 1975), former commander of the United Liberation Movement of Liberia for Democracy sentenced for rape and murder
Guus Kouwenhoven (born 1942), convicted of illegal arms trafficking related to war crimes in Liberia
Ahmad al-Faqi al-Mahdi (born 1975), member of Ansar Dine, sentenced to 9 years in prison for the war crime of attacking various religious buildings during the Northern Mali conflict.
Mengistu Haile Mariam (born 1937), Chairman of the Derg military junta, sentenced to death in absentia for his role in the Qey Shibir
Bosco Ntaganda (born 1973), former chief of staff of the National Congress for the Defence of the People sentenced to 30 years' imprisonment for war crimes
Dominic Ongwen (born 1975), commander of the Ugandan rebel group the Lord's Resistance Army who was convicted of crimes against women, including forced pregnancy

Asia
Yuri Budanov (1963–2011), officer of the Russian Armed Forces, sentenced to ten years in prison for war crimes committed during both the First and Second Chechen Wars, later released on parole after serving four years 
Illandaridevage Kulatunga, Ski Lankan military officer who helped in the construction of mass graves and aided in the torture and murder of civilians during the Sri Lankan Civil war
Hamid Nouri (born 1961), Iranian official sentenced to life in prison for executing political prisoners

Europe
Bulala Taylor (1861-1941), convicted of violating the Laws and Customs of War during the Second Boer War
Breaker Morant (1864–1902), convicted and executed for illegal summary executions of Boer and other prisoners during the Second Boer War
Peter Handcock (1868-1902), convicted and executed for murdering civilians during the Second Boer War 
Peter von Hagenbach (c. 1420 – May 9, 1474), executed for commanding troops who committed rape during the occupation of Breisach 
George Ramsdale Witton (1874-1942), convicted of murdering nine POWs during the Second Boer War 

North America 
William Calley (born 1943), United States Army soldier who was one of the main perpetrators of the My Lai Massacre during the Vietnam War, initially sentenced to life in prison, but this was later changed to house arrest, and he would be released on parole only three years later
Edwin Forbes Glenn (1857–1926), U.S. Army Major General who water boarded a man in the Philippines during the Spanish–American War, given a fine and taken out of command for 1 month
Inocente Orlando Montano, Salvadoran army colonel convicted for the 1989 murders of Jesuits in El Salvador
Efraín Ríos Montt (1926–2018), President of Guatemala from 1982 to 1983, sentenced to 80 years in prison for war crimes and acts of genocide perpetrated during the Guatemala Civil War

South America
Manuel De La Torre Herrera, Peruvian police officer during the Alberto Fujimori Administration, convicted in Canada
Telmo Hurtado, major in the Peruvian army who participated in the Accomarca massacre
Juan Rivera Rondon, Lieutenant in the Peruvian army who participated in the Accomarca massacre

References

Glueck, Sheldon. War Criminals: Their Prosecution and Punishment. New York: Kraus Reprint Corporation, 1966.
Minear, Richard H. Victors' Justice: The Tokyo War Crimes Trial. Princeton, New Jersey: Princeton University Press, 1971.
Taylor, Telford. Nuremberg and Vietnam: an American Tragedy''. Chicago: Quadrangle Books, 1970.

Lists of criminals
Lists of office-holders
 List